Passiflora cinnabarina, commonly known as red passionflower, is a species of flowering plant in the family Passifloraceae and is endemic to south-eastern Australia. It is a climber or scrambler with three-lobed leaves and red flowers.

Description
Flowering occurs from September to January and the fruit is a green berry.

Taxonomy
Passiflora cinnibarina was first formally described in 1855 by John Lindley in The Gardeners' Chronicle and Agricultural Gazette from plants grown from seed collected by "Lieut.-Colonel Sir Thomas Mitchell". The specific epithet (cinnibarina) is a Latin words meaning vermilion.

Distribution and habitat
Red passionflower grows along rivers in rainforest and forest, often in rocky sites and occurs from northern New South Wales, along the coast and ranges through the Australian Capital Territory to eastern Victoria. It has also become naturalised in a few sites in Tasmania.

Ecology
The seeds of P. cinnabarina are spread by birds and possibly mammals and the plant has become an environmental weed in Victoria, Tasmania and New Zealand.

Use in horticulture
This climber can be propagated from seed or from cuttings and can be grown in full sun to semi shade. It is relatively frost-tolerant but requires moist soil.

References

External links
 

cinnabarina
Flora of Australia
Plants described in 1855
Flora of New South Wales
Flora of Victoria (Australia)
Taxa named by John Lindley